The year 1903 in radio involved some significant events.

Events
 19 January – The first west–east transatlantic radio broadcast is made from the United States to England.
 August – Preliminary Conference on Wireless Telegraphy held in Berlin.

Births
 17 January – Douglas Cleverdon, English radio producer and bookseller (d. 1987)
 16 February – Norman Shelley, English radio actor (d. 1980)
 31 August – Arthur Godfrey, American radio and television host (d. 1983)
 1 October – Edward Archibald Fraser Harding, English radio producer (d. 1953)
 29 December – George Elrick, Scottish bandleader and disc jockey (d. 1999)

References

 
Radio by year